Isak Grimholm (born 25 March 1985) is a Swedish former ski jumper.

He made his Continental Cup debut in August 2002 in Marikollen, and his best result is a victory from Iron Mountain in February 2007. He participated in the FIS Junior World Ski Championships in 2002 and 2003. He made his World Cup debut in December 2002 in Trondheim, finishing 46th, and collected his first World Cup points with a 27th place in February 2007 in Planica. He has not collected World Cup points since.

References

Swedish male ski jumpers
People from Örnsköldsvik Municipality
1985 births
Living people
Sportspeople from Västernorrland County
21st-century Swedish people